The  priestly sash or girdle (Hebrew  avnet) was part of the ritual garments worn by Jewish high priests who served in the Temple in Jerusalem. 

The "sash" or "girdle" worn by the High Priest was of fine linen with "embroidered work" in blue, purple and scarlet; those worn by the priests were of white, twined linen. The sash should not be confused with the embroidered belt of the ephod. Like the other priestly vestments, the purpose of the sash was "for glory and for beauty". On the Day of Atonement the High Priest changed into special linen garments that included a sash of fine linen without any embroidery. These linen garments were worn only once, with new ones being made each year.

Rabbinical commentary 
According to Rabbinical literature, Midrash and Maimonides, the sash was 32 cubits long and 2, 3 or 4 fingers wide. At this length, it would have to have been wound around the body several times. Theories differ as to how this was accomplished: some say it was wound around the waist only, while others say it was wound around the waist and over the shoulders, crossing over the heart. In any event, the ends would have been tied and allowed to hang down in front. According to the Talmud, the wearing of the sash atoned for "sins of the heart" (impure thoughts) on the part of the Children of Israel.

See also 
 Michnasayim
 Priestly tunic
 Mitznefet
 Priestly robe (Judaism)
 Ephod
 Priestly breastplate
 Tzitz

References 

Jewish religious clothing
Sash